Reuben Hoshke HaKohen (Sofer) (died 3 April 1673) (Hebrew: אברהם ראובן הכהן סופר) was a Kabalist and  rabbi of Prague.   "Hoshke," his father's name, is a Polish diminutive for "Joshua," mistaken by G.B. De Rossi and Zunz for his family name.

He wrote:
Yalḳuṭ Re'ubeni, a kabbalistic work (an imitation of the Yalḳuṭ Ḥadash) containing a collection of sayings taken from other kabbalistic works and arranged in alphabetical order (Prague, 1660)
 Yalḳuṭ Re'ubeni ha-Gadol, (ילקוט ראובני הגדול) a kabbalistic midrash on the Pentateuch arranged according to the order of the parashiyyot (Wilmersdorf, 1681)
 Davar Shebi-Ḳedushah, a manual of asceticism and repentance (Sulzbach, 1684)
 Oneg Shabbat, cabalistic reflections on the Sabbath laws, followed by an appendix entitled Derek Ḳabbalat Shabbat (ib. 1684).

References 

 Its bibliography:
Lieben, Gal 'Ed, German part, p. 41; Hebrew part, p. 36;
Steinschneider, Cat. Bodl. col. 2138;
Fürst, Bibl. Jud. i. 412.

1673 deaths
Kabbalists
17th-century Bohemian rabbis
Rabbis from Prague
Kohanim writers of Rabbinic literature
Year of birth unknown